Sanka is a brand of instant decaffeinated coffee, sold around the world, and was one of the earliest decaffeinated varieties. Sanka is distributed in the United States by Kraft Heinz.

History
Decaffeinated coffee was developed in 1903 by a team of researchers led by Ludwig Roselius in Bremen, Germany. It was first sold in Germany and many other European countries in 1905–1906 under the name Kaffee HAG (short for Kaffee Handels-Aktien-Gesellschaft, or Coffee Trading Public Company). In France, the brand name became Sanka, derived from the French words sans caféine ("without caffeine"). The brand came to the United States in 1909–1910, where it was first marketed under the name "Dekafa" or "Dekofa" by an American sales agent.

In 1914, Roselius founded his own company, Kaffee Hag Corporation, in New York. When Kaffee Hag was confiscated by the Alien Property Custodian during World War I and sold to an American firm, Roselius lost not only his company, but also the American trademark rights to the name. To re-establish his product, he began to use the Sanka brand name in America.

In Europe, the Hag company used the Sanka brand in many countries (the Netherlands, Belgium, Germany, and Switzerland, amongst others) as a cheaper alternative to the premium brand Coffee Hag. The brand disappeared in these countries after World War II, but it continued until the 1970s as the premium brand in France. First marketed in the U.S. in 1923, Sanka was initially sold only at two Sanka Coffee Houses in New York, but it soon was brought into retail.

Advertising
The intensive American advertising campaigns included the 1927 broadcasts of Sanka After-Dinner Hour (or Sanka Music, Sanka After-Dinner Music, Sanka Music Hour, and Sanka After-Dinner Coffee Hour), heard at 6:30 pm Tuesdays on New York's WEAF.  Sanka was a sponsor of I Love Lucy, The Twilight Zone, and The Andy Griffith Show during their respective runs on CBS television in the 1950s and early 1960s. The Andy Griffith Show Sanka sponsor spots featured the cast members.  It was also a sponsor of The Goldbergs (1920s to about 1960 on radio and television, unrelated to the U.S. 2013 ABC television series) where, on many episodes, Mrs. Goldberg (Gertrude Berg) would address the camera and talk to the TV audience and tell them about Sanka coffee. After the sales pitch, she would walk away, usually from the window, and start the show.

With such promotion, Sanka became a nationwide sales success, with General Foods Corporation taking over distribution in 1928 as a defensive measure, since Sanka directly competed with its noncaffeine coffee substitute Postum. The bright orange label that made Sanka easily identifiable to consumers found its way into coffee shops around the country in the form of the decaf coffee pot. Coffee pots with a bright orange handle are a direct result of the American public's association of the color orange with Sanka, no matter which brand of coffee is actually served. Businesses that serve rival Folgers decaffeinated coffee usually have green-handled pots.

The 1941 Laurel and Hardy comedy Great Guns includes a scene in which Stan Laurel, in an Army mess hall line, is handed a cup of coffee.  He asks "Sanka?", and the mess attendant replies, "You're welcome!"  In the song, "Bianca", in Cole Porter's 1948 musical-comedy Kiss Me, Kate, the lyric "I would gladly give up coffee for Sanka," is included.  Sanka is also mentioned in the 1982 film Fast Times at Ridgemont High, when science teacher Mr. Vargas declares, "Look, I'm a little slow today. I just switched to Sanka, so have a heart." At the end of the film, Mr. Vargas is revealed to have switched back to coffee.

In the 1954 Ian Fleming novel Live and Let Die, James Bond orders Sanka for Solitaire and himself: "Bond ordered Old Fashioneds, and stipulated ‘Old Grandad’ Bourbon, chicken sandwiches, and decaffeined ‘Sanka’ coffee so that their sleep would not be spoilt."

From 1976 to 1982, veteran actor Robert Young was Sanka's television spokesman, appearing in a whole series of commercials. During the mid-1980s, a series of Sanka television commercials aired featuring Lena Horne.

In the 1993 film Cool Runnings, Doug E. Doug plays the fictionalized role of Sanka Coffie, a pushcart derby driver and member of the Jamaican Olympic bobsled team.

In season one, episode four of the 2022 television series Reboot, Paul Reiser's character, Gordon Gelman, finds an old jar of Sanka coffee in the office kitchen and asks, "Hey does anyone know if Sanka expires?"

Sanka albums
In France, Café Sanka issued heraldic picture albums in the same style as the Coffee Hag albums. However, only six albums of the planned 42 were ever published.

References
 7. from Dahmer, Episode 5 ("Santa OK?" "Santa's fine. Thank You")

External links
 

Coffee brands
Kraft Foods brands
Products introduced in 1903